The 1954 Wake Forest Demon Deacons football team was an American football team that represented Wake Forest University during the 1954 college football season. In their fourth season under head coach Tom Rogers, the Demon Deacons compiled a 3–6–1 record and finished in sixth place in the Atlantic Coast Conference with a 1–4–1 record against conference opponents.

End Ed Stowers and tackle Bob Bartholomew were selected by the Associated Press as first-team players on the 1954 All-Atlantic Coast Conference football team.  Bartholomew was the only unanimous selection by all 43 voters.

Schedule

Team leaders

References

Wake Forest
Wake Forest Demon Deacons football seasons
Wake Forest Demon Deacons football